Denis Andreyevich Osipov (born May 9, 1987), also competing as Dannisi Aoxibofu, is a Russian-born Chinese professional ice hockey defenceman. Born in Russia, he is currently an unrestricted free agent. He most recently played under contract with HC Kunlun Red Star of the Kontinental Hockey League (KHL). He represented China at the 2022 Winter Olympics.

During the 2015–16 season, Osipov played 21 games with Admiral Vladivostok before he was claimed off waivers by Metallurg Magnitogorsk on November 9, 2015.

Due to his stint in China, Osipov was called up to represent the China men's national ice hockey team for the 2022 Winter Olympics.

Career statistics

Regular season and playoffs

International

References

External links

1987 births
Living people
Chinese ice hockey defencemen
Olympic ice hockey players of China
Russian ice hockey defencemen
Russian emigrants to China
Naturalized citizens of the People's Republic of China
Admiral Vladivostok players
Avtomobilist Yekaterinburg players
HC Dinamo Minsk players
Krylya Sovetov Moscow players
HC Kunlun Red Star players
Lokomotiv Yaroslavl players
Metallurg Magnitogorsk players
HC MVD players
Ice hockey people from Moscow
HC Yugra players
Russian expatriate sportspeople
Russian expatriates in China
Ice hockey players at the 2022 Winter Olympics